Kyauktada may refer to:
Kyauktada Township, Yangon, Burma
The fictional setting of the novel Burmese Days by George Orwell